Chabertia elegans is a species of plants in the family Rosaceae.

References

External links 

Rosaceae
Plants described in 1881